José Luis Salgado Gómez (born 3 April 1966) is a Mexican former footballer and manager.

Career
Salgado began playing professional football with Pumas UNAM, making his Primera debut in 1985, and subsequently playing for Tecos, C.F. Monterrey, Club América, Club León, and Atlético Morelia. He also played for the Mexico national football team, and was a participant at the 1994 FIFA World Cup.

After he retired from playing, Salgado became a football manager. He led Pumas Morelos in the Primera A. Salgado was interim manager for Estudiantes Tecos for the final match of the Apertura 2011 season, before briefly managing the club in the Clausura 2012 season.

References

External links

 
 

1966 births
Living people
Mexico international footballers
Footballers from Mexico City
1994 FIFA World Cup players
Club Universidad Nacional footballers
Tecos F.C. footballers
C.F. Monterrey players
Club América footballers
Club León footballers
Atlético Morelia players
Tecos F.C. managers
Association football defenders
Mexican footballers
Mexican football managers
Liga MX players